How the Universe Works is a documentary science television series that originally aired on the Discovery Channel in 2010. All but the second and eighth seasons were narrated by Mike Rowe. The second and eighth seasons, as well as episodes of the fifth and sixth seasons, were narrated by Erik Todd Dellums. The first season, broadcast from April 25 to May 24, 2010, was released on Blu-ray on February 28, 2012. Since its second season, consisting of eight episodes broadcast between July 11 and August 29, 2012, the show has aired on the Science Channel. The third season aired between July 9 and September 3, 2014. The fourth season premiered on July 14, 2015, as part of the Science Channel's "Space Week," in honor of New Horizons' flyby of Pluto that day; the season ran through September 1, 2015. The show's fifth season aired from November 22, 2016, through February 7, 2017. The sixth season premiered on January 9, 2018, and ran through March 13, 2018. The seventh season premiered on January 8, 2019. On December 30, 2019, it was announced that the eighth season would premiere on January 2, 2020. The ninth season premiered on March 24, 2021. The tenth season premiered on March 6, 2022. The eleventh season premiered on March 5, 2023.

Episode list

Season 1 (2010)

Season 2 (2012)

Season 3 (2014)

Season 4 (2015)

Season 5 (2016–17)

Season 6 (2018)

Season 7 (2019)

Season 8 (2020)

Season 9 (2021)

Season 10 (2022)

Season 11 (2023)

See also
Alien Planet
Cosmos: A Spacetime Odyssey
Extreme Universe
Into the Universe with Stephen Hawking
Killers of the Cosmos
Mars: The Secret Science
The Planets and Beyond
Space's Deepest Secrets
Strip the Cosmos
Through the Wormhole
The Universe

References

External links

2010 American television series debuts
2010s American documentary television series
2020s American documentary television series
Discovery Channel original programming
Documentary television series about astronomy
Science Channel original programming